The scarlet harlequin toad or sapito arlequin de Soriano (Atelopus sorianoi) is a species of toad in the family Bufonidae.
It is endemic to Venezuela.
Its natural habitats are subtropical or tropical moist montane forests and rivers.
It is threatened by habitat loss. It may already be extinct. The toad is among the 25 “most wanted lost” species that are the focus of Global Wildlife Conservation's “Search for Lost Species” initiative.

References

Atelopus
Amphibians of the Andes
Endemic fauna of Venezuela
Amphibians described in 1983
Taxonomy articles created by Polbot